Aimé Leon Meyvis (1877 in Sint-Gillis-Waas, Flanders – 1932) was a Flemish landscape painter who emigrated to East Rochester, New York in 1902. He became a member of the group known as the Finger Lakes Regional Artists. Meyvis studied at The Royal Academy in The Hague in the Netherlands. He exhibited at the 3rd Exhibition of Contemporary Artists in Washington, D.C., the National Academy of Design, the Pennsylvania Academy of the Fine Arts, The Art Institute of Chicago and the Rochester Art Club. Most of his work was done in oils.

References

Belgian painters
20th-century American painters
American male painters
1877 births
1932 deaths
Royal Academy of Art, The Hague alumni
20th-century American male artists